Rod McKuen was an American poet, singer-songwriter, and actor.

Albums

Singles & EPs

Miscellaneous

References 

https://www.discogs.com/artist/283844-Rod-McKuen
https://books.google.com/books?id=OwkEAAAAMBAJ&lpg=RA1-PA16&dq
http://www.45cat.com/artist/rod-mckuen/all

Discographies of American artists